Time Machine 2011: Live in Cleveland is a concert DVD, Blu-ray and double CD by Canadian rock band Rush released on 8 November 2011. It was filmed on 15 April 2011 at the Quicken Loans Arena in Cleveland, Ohio during the band's Time Machine Tour. The DVD film was recorded by Banger Films, which had previously produced the Rush documentary Rush: Beyond the Lighted Stage. The Moving Pictures portion of the concert was released on vinyl and digitally under the title Moving Pictures: Live 2011.

The album was nominated for a Juno Award in the "Music DVD of the Year" category. On 14 May 2014, the DVD was certified 2× Platinum in the US with 200,000 copies sold. It was later reissued as a part of the DVD and Blu-ray box set titled R40, released on 11 November 2014.

Track listing
The following is the setlist of the concert filmed for Time Machine 2011: Live in Cleveland.

DVD/Blu-ray extras
 Outtakes from the video introductions to both sets
 Alternate film intro version of "Tom Sawyer"
 "Need Some Love" – Live at Laura Secord Secondary School, St Catharines, Ontario, 1974 (with original drummer John Rutsey; part of the band's appearance on the TV series Canadian Bandstand)
 "Anthem" – Live in Passaic, New Jersey, 1976

The post-show video that played during the tour (featuring Paul Rudd and Jason Segel) is not included on the DVD/Blu-ray release. In its place is a closing segment that features Lee, Lifeson and Peart performing a polka rendition of "Closer to the Heart" and portraying their characters from the video intro for the first set.

Charts
Audio

Certifications
DVD

References

2011 live albums
2011 video albums
Live video albums
Rush (band) live albums
Rush (band) video albums